Violett-Martin House and Gardens is a historic home and garden located in Goshen, Elkhart County, Indiana.  The house was built between 1855 and 1858, and is a two-story, Italianate style red brick dwelling with a hipped roof.  It was enlarged in the 1920s.  Also on the property are the contributing garage, workhouse, greenhouse built circa 1920 and landscaped grounds with pergola.

It was added to the National Register of Historic Places in 2007.

References

Houses on the National Register of Historic Places in Indiana
Italianate architecture in Indiana
Houses completed in 1858
Houses in Elkhart County, Indiana
National Register of Historic Places in Elkhart County, Indiana